Emerentia Påvelsdotter Krakow née Pauli (died 1648), was a Swedish heroine, known as the defender of the Gullberg Fortress against the Danish at Gothenburg during the Swedish-Danish Kalmar War in 1612.

Life
Emerentia was married to the commendant of Gullberg Fortress, Mårten Krakow, in 1604 and had six children. In 1612, the fortress was attacked by Denmark during the Kalmar War. After having been wounded, Mårten Krakow left the defence of the fortress to his wife. 

At the Danish attack 27 January 1612, she successfully repelled five attacks during a period of six hours : by the help of the soldier's wives, she, among other things, loaded and fired the cannons. By her acts, the Danes were defeated. Her husband was promoted to governor of Vaxholm in 1612, and when he was retired in 1613, it was pointed out, that he was given his pension in recognition of his and his wives bravery in their defense of the country. 

She became a widow in 1616, and is said to have managed her estates forcefully.

Legacy
Her defence of Gullberg was described by her daughter Cecilia (d. 1683) and published in 1760. In Gothenburg, a road is named after her: Emerentias backe, near Skansen Lejonet.

References 
 http://www.tonnquist.se/artik/5-lys/58_krakow.pdf
 Ingel Wadén: Berättande källor till Calmarkrigets historia (Lund 1936, s. 60-78)

Further reading
 

1648 deaths
17th-century Swedish people
Swedish military personnel
Women in 17th-century warfare
Year of birth unknown
16th-century births
Women in war in Sweden
17th-century Swedish women